Wing Arena Kariya is an arena in Kariya, Aichi, Japan. It is located in Kariya City General Athletic Park.

Description 
It was built in January, 2007. It has 2,376 seats (1,576 fixed, 800 temporary).

It is the home arena of the SeaHorses Mikawa of the B.League, Japan's professional basketball league. It is the home arena of the Denso Iris and Toyota Boshoku Sunshine Rabbits of the Women's Japan Basketball League.

Gallery

References

External links
Wing Arena Kariya

Basketball venues in Japan
Indoor arenas in Japan
SeaHorses Mikawa
Sports venues in Aichi Prefecture
Swimming venues in Japan
Venues of the 2026 Asian Games
Asian Games basketball venues
Sports venues completed in 2007
2007 establishments in Japan
Kariya, Aichi